Jacques Friedel ForMemRS (11 February 1921 – 27 August 2014) was a French physicist and material scientist.

Education
Friedel attended the Cours Hattemer, a private school. He studied at the École Polytechnique from 1944 to 1946, and the École nationale supérieure des mines de Paris from 1946 to 1948. He graduated from the University of Paris with a Licence ès sciences degree in 1948, then studied at the Metallurgy Laboratory of the School of Mines with Charles Crussard.  He graduated from the University of Bristol with a PhD in 1952, where he studied with Nevill Francis Mott, and a Doctorat d'Etat in Paris in 1954.

Career
He was assistant professor at Paris-Sorbonne University in 1956, then full professor of Solid State Physics (from 1959 to 1989) at the University of Paris-Sud where he co-founded the Laboratory of Solid State Physics. He authored more than 200 journal articles.

He was the president of the Société française de physique, the European Physical Society, and the French Academy of Sciences from 1992 to 1994.

Awards and honors
Friedel was awarded the gold medal of the French CNRS in 1970, elected as a foreign member of the National Academy of Sciences, the Royal Swedish Academy of Sciences and a Foreign Member of the Royal Society (ForMemRS) in 1988. He was a fellow of American Physical Society and fellow of European Physical Society. He received in 1964 the Holweck Prize and in 1988 the Von Hippel Award.  He was appointed a Knight of the Légion d'Honneur, promoted to Officer and subsequently to Commander on 31 March 1989 and to Grand Officer on 30 December 1995. He was promoted to Grand Cross on 14 July 2013.

Personal life
Friedel's great-grandfather Charles Friedel was an organic chemist and crystallographer at Paris-Sorbonne University, his grandfather Georges Friedel worked on liquid crystals, and his father Edmond Friedel was the director of the National School of Mines from 1937 to 1965.

See also
Slater–Pauling rule

References

1921 births
2014 deaths
École Polytechnique alumni
Mines Paris - PSL alumni
Corps des mines
French people of German descent
French physicists
Foreign Members of the Royal Society
Recipients of the Great Cross of the National Order of Scientific Merit (Brazil)
Members of the French Academy of Sciences
Foreign associates of the National Academy of Sciences
Alumni of the University of Bristol
Members of the German Academy of Sciences Leopoldina
Grand Croix of the Légion d'honneur
Fellows of the American Physical Society
University of Paris alumni
French expatriates in the United Kingdom
Presidents of the European Physical Society
Members of the Royal Swedish Academy of Sciences
Presidents of the Société Française de Physique